Villa Terrace is a historic house in Milwaukee, Wisconsin. It was built in 1924 for the Lloyd R. Smith family - an Italian Renaissance-style home on a bluff above Lake Michigan. Since 1966 the house and grounds have housed the Villa Terrace Decorative Arts Museum.  It is listed on the National Register of Historic Places as Lloyd R. Smith House.

History 
Lloyd Smith (1883–1944) was the president of A.O. Smith Corporation. After returning from a trip to Italy, the Smiths commissioned architect David Adler to design their new home. The architecture and water stairs were inspired by Villa Cicogna Mozzoni (built in the 1560s) in Lombardy, Italy. Smith called the house Sopra Mare, which is Italian for "above the sea." The general form is a rectangle surrounding an open central courtyard. Walls are of red brick that has been painted white. The roof is covered with barrel tile. Inside, the original rooms included a dining room with beamed ceiling of pecky cypress wood, a living room with fireplaces and pegged walnut floor, and a library. The ironwork in the home is from the Milwaukee studio of Cyril Colnik, an Austrian-born blacksmith.

The surrounding bluff is landscaped with terraces and formal gardens, a "water stairway," fishponds, and two secret gardens. Rose Standish Nichols is credited with the original landscape design. No record of her plan for the Smith residence has been found.

Lloyd Smith died in 1944. In 1966 the Smith family donated their home to Milwaukee County to serve as a Decorative Arts Museum. Some rooms were converted to offices, but the house and grounds changed little with the transition from home to museum. In 1976, a formal planting of sugar maple bosques with privet hedges and white gravel was installed.

Villa Terrace's art collection features fine and decorative arts dating from the 15th through the 19th centuries, wrought iron masterpieces by Cyril Colnik and changing exhibitions highlighting the decorative arts. It is also the host of a Garden Lecture series, in which attendees are able to learn more about planning and maintenance for their home gardens.

Renaissance Garden 
In 1997, The Friends of Villa Terrace Board committed themselves to restore the gardens at Villa Terrace. Based on the master plan created by Buettner & Associates, volunteers with the Renaissance Garden Club began two years of site clearing in the spring of 1998. Construction of the gardens began in 2000 and continued for two more years. After four years of work, the gardens officially opened to the public in July 2002.

Weddings 
Villa Terrace is a popular site for weddings and receptions in Milwaukee. The Italian villa, picturesque garden, unique stairways and breath-taking views of Lake Michigan provide scenery that would otherwise only be attainable by traveling to Europe.

See also
Hermes

References

External links
Official website

Art museums and galleries in Wisconsin
Decorative arts museums in the United States
Houses on the National Register of Historic Places in Wisconsin
Museums in Milwaukee
Houses in Milwaukee
Italianate architecture in Wisconsin
Villas in the United States
National Register of Historic Places in Milwaukee